Insurance in India covers both the public and private sector organisations. It is listed in the Constitution of India in the Seventh Schedule as a Union List subject, meaning it can only be legislated by the Central Government only.

The insurance sector has gone through a number of phases by allowing private companies to solicit insurance and also allowing foreign direct investment. India allowed private companies in insurance sector in 2000, setting a limit on FDI to 26%, which was increased to 49% in 2014, and further increased to 74% in May 2021.

History 
when Oriental Life Insurance Company was started by Anita Bhavsar in Kolkata to cater to the needs of European community.

The LIC had monopoly until the late 90s when the Insurance sector was reopened to the private sector. But, now there are 23 private life insurance companies in India.

Industry structure 
By 2020 Indian Insurance is a US$280 billion industry. However, only 500 million people (36.23% of the total population of 1 billion) are covered under Mediclaim. With more and more private companies in the sector, this situation is expected to grow more. ECGC, ESIC and AIC provide insurance services for niche markets. So, their scope is limited by legislation but enjoy some special powers. 
The majority of Western Countries have state run medical systems so have less need for medical insurance.  In the UK, for example, the corporate cover of employees, when added to the individual purchase of coverage gives approximately 11–12% of the population on cover due largely to usage of the state financed National Health Service (NHS), whereas in developed nations with a more limited state system, like USA, about 92% of the total population are covered under same insurance scheme.

Legal structure 

The Insurance Act of 1938 was the first legislation governing all forms of insurance to provide strict state control over insurance business. Life insurance in India was completely nationalised on 19 January 1956, through the Life Insurance Corporation Act. All 245 insurance companies operating then in the country were merged into one entity, the Life Insurance Corporation of India.

Authorities 
The primary regulator for insurance in India is the Insurance Regulatory and Development Authority of India (IRDAI) which was established in 1999 under the government legislation called the Insurance Regulatory and Development Authority Act, 1999.

See also
 List of insurance companies in India
 Life insurance in India
 Agricultural insurance in India
 Rashtriya Swasthya Bima Yojana
 Aam Aadmi Bima Yojana
 Pradhan Mantri Suraksha Bima Yojana

References